Cody Baker (born January 7 ,2004) is an American soccer player who plays as a centre-back and right-back for USL Championship club Tacoma Defiance.

Club career
Born in Washington, Baker joined the youth setup of Major League Soccer club Seattle Sounders FC in 2018. While in the academy, Baker began as a centre-back before converting to right-back. In March 2021, Baker was named by Sounders FC head coach Brian Schmetzer as one of the academy players who could be called-up to the first team: "I would say that Cody Baker is another one on my list. He’s been a surprise. He might not quite be ready, but he’s going to be ready".

On May 13, 2021, Baker made his professional debut for Sounders FC's USL Championship affiliate Tacoma Defiance against San Diego Loyal, coming on as a 79th minute substitute in a 3–1 victory.

On July 21, 2021, Baker signed a professional contract with Tacoma.

Career statistics

Club

References

External links
 Profile at U.S. Soccer Development Academy

2004 births
Living people
Sportspeople from Washington (state)
American soccer players
Association football defenders
Tacoma Defiance players
USL Championship players
Soccer players from Washington (state)
MLS Next Pro players